Haxell is a surname. Notable people with the surname include: 

 Frank Haxell (1912–1988), British trade unionist and communist activist
 Penny Haxell, Canadian mathematician